Aberdeen is a populated place in Monroe County, Arkansas, United States.

Geography 
Aberdeen is located at  (34.6034302, -91.3417918). Aberdeen is located off Arkansas Highway 366, approximately  due east of the White River.

Demographics 
As of the census of 2014, there were 107 people residing within  radius of Aberdeen. This is a 6.14% decrease since the census of 2010.

Climate
The closest town for which climate data is available is Roe, Arkansas. The climate in this area is characterized by hot, humid summers and generally mild to cool winters.  According to the Köppen Climate Classification system, this locale has a humid subtropical climate, abbreviated "Cfa" on climate maps.

References

Unincorporated communities in Monroe County, Arkansas
Unincorporated communities in Arkansas